The Uninvited Guest is a 2004 Spanish mystery thriller film and the directorial debut of Guillem Morales.  It stars Andoni Gracia, Mónica López and Francesc Garrido.

Plot
Felix (Gracia) is an architect who lives in a large house. He appears to be sensitive about visitors since being separated from his wife Vera (López). One night, a man asks to come in and use the phone. Felix allows him to do so, leaves the room for a few minutes, and then discovers the man is nowhere to be seen. For the next few days, Felix hears strange noises in the house, and suspects that the man never left. Felix calls the police who are unable to find anything. He then calls Vera and asks her to visit him, eventually resulting in them having sex. But he becomes paranoid when he thinks he hears her talking to someone in the kitchen and accidentally injures her with a knife.

Felix's suspicions are heightened when his neighbour's dog enters the house and appears to hear noises from upstairs too. His neighbour, Mrs Mueller, runs after the dog and appears to be thrown down the stairs, killing her and her dog in the process. The police determine that she merely slipped. Eventually, Felix encounters someone in his house and shoots them, leaving them locked in a room. Felix locks down his house and leaves. He naps in his car until he is awakened by two children who are looking at a picture that Felix drew of the strange man. They identify him as "Martin" and points Felix towards Martin's house.

Felix sneaks into Martin's house and sees Martin's wife; Claudia (also played by López) who is paralysed from the waist down. Felix stays hidden in her house for the next few days and discovers that Martin is an archeologist who was away on a business trip and has been unkind to Claudia since her accident. Felix becomes infatuated with Claudia and manages to speak to her by hiding in plain sight at a surprise birthday party.

Eventually, Felix alerts Claudia and Martin's friend Bruno to his presence by breaking a vase and finding a key to the locked basement. Claudia reveals to Bruno that she actually locked Martin in the basement. Felix escapes the house through the basement (in the process taking an injury from Bruno and possibly injuring/killing Bruno and Claudia in turn), which leads to a tunnel where he finds Martin's corpse. The tunnel leads to Felix's own basement. Felix climbs upstairs and discovers that the "man" he shot a few nights ago is actually Vera, who as she lays dying on the floor, reveals she is pregnant.

Cast

Release 
The film premiered at the 37th Sitges Film Festival in December 2004. The film was theatrically released in Spain on 21 October 2015.

Reception
Mónica López clinched the Best Actress Award at Sitges for her double role in the film. Morales was nominated for the Goya Award for Best New Director the 20th Goya Awards for his work on The Uninvited Guest.

See also
 List of Spanish films of 2005
 List of films featuring home invasions

References

External links 
 
 

2004 films
2000s Spanish-language films
Spanish thriller films
2004 directorial debut films
Rodar y Rodar films
2000s Spanish films